The Great Redwood Trail is a proposed multi-use rail-to-trail project connecting San Francisco and Humboldt bays in Northern California. Most of the trail will be built on the rail bed of the defunct Northwestern Pacific Railroad along the Eel River Canyon by the Great Redwood Trail Agency. The southern portion will be built by Sonoma–Marin Area Rail Transit (SMART) along their commuter rail line. The trail route is within 5 counties, 14 cities and the ancestral territory of many tribes. Some portions have already constructed by local jurisdictions with more being developed in cooperation with local governments.

The Great Redwood Trail Agency was established in March 2022. The agency took over management of the railroad corridor from the North Coast Railroad Authority to begin preparing a master plan to develop the trail. The California Coastal Conservancy is providing staff for the agency since they have decades experience with the California Coastal Trail. Situated in Marin, Sonoma, Mendocino, Trinity, and Humboldt Counties, the route passes through the cities of Novato, Petaluma, Rohnert Park, Santa Rosa, Windsor, Healdsburg, Cloverdale, Ukiah, Willits, Fortuna, Rio Dell, Eureka, Arcata, and Blue Lake. The first completed segment of the trail was celebrated by State Senator Mike McGuire in Ukiah in February 2020. The city approved the construction of the final trail segment for the entire  within the city in September 2021. A section in the city of Willits is being planned. The trail will pass through the Eel River Canyon Preserve which includes the Grand Canyon of the Wild and Scenic Eel River, home to dozens of endangered species and rare wildlife. The trail alignment through the Eel River will be challenging due to erosive geology and some failing infrastructure, including tunnels, bridges, and trestles. The project also has to deal with private property owners on either side of the trail right-of-way. Two or three years of public meetings will be held  before the master plan is released.

In Sonoma and Marin Counties

References

External links
 The Great Redwood Trail Agency
 Great Redwood Trail California State Coastal Conservancy
 Great Redwood Trail Master Plan 
 Great Redwood Trail Master Plan, Alta Planning + Design
 The Great Redwood Trail - Ukiah, City of Ukiah, CA
 Great Redwood Trail Alliance (archived)

Rail trails in California
Trails in the San Francisco Bay Area
Transportation in Humboldt County, California
Transportation in Trinity County, California
Transportation in Mendocino County, California